Were the World Mine is a 2008 romantic musical fantasy film directed by Tom Gustafson, written by Gustafson and Cory James Krueckeberg, and starring Tanner Cohen, Wendy Robie, Judy McLane, Zelda Williams, Jill Larson, Ricky Goldman, Nathaniel David Becker, Christian Stolte, and David Darlow.

The film is a story of gay empowerment, inspired by Shakespeare’s A Midsummer Night’s Dream.

Plot
Timothy (Tanner Cohen) is an openly gay student at a private boys' school. Although now in his senior year, he is still persecuted by the aggressive rugby team, on whose captain, Jonathon (Nathaniel David Becker), he has a crush. Timothy lives with his mother, Donna (Judy McLane), who is struggling with her son's sexuality and with getting a job, and his father who is not a part of his life.

Timothy is cast as Puck in the senior production of A Midsummer Night's Dream. While reviewing his lines, he discovers the recipe for creating the flower love-in-idleness. Timothy uses the flower to have the homophobic town take a "walk in his shoes". The entire town is thrown into chaos as previously heterosexual community members fall in love with their same-sex friends, bosses, and co-workers: whomever they first saw after being sprayed by the flower. The school drama teacher, Ms. Tebbit (Wendy Robie), guides Timothy towards the question of whether his actions have caused more harm than good.

Cast

Musical numbers
 "Oh Timothy" – Jonathon
 "Pity" – Frankie
 "Audition" / "Be As Thou Wast Wont" – Timothy, Ms. Tebbit
 "He's Gay" – Frankie
 "Were the World Mine" – Timothy, Jonathon
 "The Course of True Love" – Timothy, Frankie, Coach Driskill, Nora, Max, Donna
 "All Things Shall Be Peace" – Ms. Tebbit, Timothy
 "Sleep Sound" – Timothy
 "Pyramus and Thisbe" – Frankie, Cooper

Production
The film is a feature-length version of director Gustafson's 2003 short film, Fairies, which also stars Wendy Robie. The film was executive produced by Gill Holland, in association with The Group Entertainment.

Release

Film festivals
Were the World Mine has played or was scheduled to play many film festivals in prominent slots in 2008. Awards already won include: Audience Award for Best Narrative Feature at the Florida Film Festival; Best Music in a Narrative Film at the Nashville Film Festival; Best LGBT Feature Film at the Nashville Film Festival; and the Audience Award for Best Narrative Feature at the Turin Gay and Lesbian Film Festival. Were the World Mine screened at the Frameline Film Festival in San Francisco on June 27, 2008, and at the Tokyo International Lesbian & Gay Film Festival on July 11, 2008. The film opened the Gay & Lesbian Film Festival in Albuquerque, New Mexico on September 26, 2008 and closed the Reel Affirmations festival in Washington, D.C. on October 26, 2008. It was presented in November 2008 at the Gay/Lesbian Film Festival QUEERSICHT in Berne and Switzerland. The film was screened as the opening night gala at the 2009 Melbourne Queer Film Festival.

Theatrical
Were the World Mine had a limited release in North American theaters on November 21, 2008.

Reception
The film holds a 71% rating on Rotten Tomatoes based on 24 reviews.

Soundtrack
The Were the World Mine original soundtrack album was released on CD on November 11, 2008 by PS Classics. The movie also features several songs used prominently in the film that were not included on the PS Classics soundtrack release, including "Relax, Take It Easy" by Mika, "The Magic Position" by Patrick Wolf and "Rock Star" by The Guts – sung by Tanner Cohen.

The Shakespearean podcast No Holds Bard uses "Pyramus and Thisbe" as their theme music.

Home media
Were the World Mine was released on DVD in Europe on May 18, and in North America on June 9, 2008.

Accolades
 Grand Jury Award for Outstanding U.S. Dramatic Feature (Heineken Red Star Award): Outfest 2008
 James Lyon Editing Award for Narrative Feature: 2008 Woodstock Film Festival
 Scion Award for First-Time Director: 2008 Philadelphia Int'l Gay & Lesbian Film Festival
 Best Music in a Narrative Feature Film and Best LGBT Feature Film:  2008 Nashville Film Festival
 Directors Award: 2008 Connecticut Gay & Lesbian Film Festival
 Jury Award for Best Overall Film: 2008 Fort Worth Gay & Lesbian Film Festival
 Adam Baran Rainbow Award for Best Narrative Feature: 2008 Honolulu Rainbow Film Festival
 Jury Award for Best Feature Film: 2008 Outflix Film Festival

Audience Awards
 Best Narrative Feature: 2008 Florida Film Festival
 Best Narrative Feature: 2008 Turin International Gay & Lesbian Film Festival
 Best Feature: 2008 Inside Out Toronto
 Best Feature: 2008 Kansas City Gay & Lesbian Film Festival
 Best Feature: Cinema Diverse 2008: Palm Springs GLFF
 Grand Prize Best Feature: Rhode Island International Film Festival 2008
 Best Feature: 2008 Vancouver Queer Film Festival

References

Further reading
 Padva, Gilad. Uses of Nostalgia in Musical Politicization of Homo/Phobic Myths in Were the World Mine, The Big Gay Musical and Zero Patience. In Padva, Gilad, Queer Nostalgia in Cinema and Pop Culture, pp. 139–172 (Palgrave Macmillan, 2014).

External links
 
 
 
 

2008 films
2008 fantasy films
2000s musical comedy films
2008 romantic comedy films
American fantasy comedy films
American independent films
American LGBT-related films
American musical comedy films
American musical fantasy films
American romantic comedy films
American romantic fantasy films
American romantic musical films
Bisexuality-related films
Features based on short films
Films based on A Midsummer Night's Dream
Gay-related films
LGBT-related musical films
LGBT-related adaptations of works by William Shakespeare
2008 LGBT-related films
LGBT-related romantic comedy films
LGBT-related coming-of-age films
2000s English-language films
2000s American films